Marisha Wallace is an American actress, best known for her work in musical theatre.

Life and career
Wallace appeared in the original Broadway casts of Aladdin (2014) and Something Rotten! (2015) as a member of the ensemble and understudy. In January 2017 she became an alternate Effie White in the West End production of Dreamgirls. Following the departure of Amber Riley from the production, Wallace took over the role, sharing with Karen Mav and Moya Angela. In 2017, she released a Christmas album called Soul Holiday. In 2019, she joined the original London cast of Waitress as Becky. In Summer 2021 she starred in the London Coliseum production of Hairspray as Motormouth Maybelle opposite Michael Ball. In 2022, she played Ado Annie in Oklahoma! at the Young Vic. 

Wallace is the singing voice of Ms. Johnston in Jingle Jangle: A Christmas Journey on Netflix.

Stage

Discography

Albums

Singles

References

External links

21st-century African-American women singers
21st-century American actresses
Actresses from North Carolina
African-American actresses
American musical theatre actresses
American women singers
Living people
People from North Carolina
Year of birth missing (living people)